Nauset Light, officially Nauset Beach Light, is a restored lighthouse on the Cape Cod National Seashore near Eastham, Massachusetts, erected in 1923 using the 1877 tower that was moved here from the Chatham Light. It is listed on the National Register of Historic Places. The adjacent oil house (where fuel was stored in the early days) is made of brick and has also been restored. Fully automated, the beacon is a private aid to navigation. Tours of the tower and oil house are available in summer from the Nauset Light Preservation Society which operates, maintains and interprets the site. The tower is located adjacent to Nauset Light Beach.

History
The tower that eventually became Nauset Light was constructed in 1877 as one of two towers in Chatham. It was moved to Eastham in 1923 to replace the Three Sisters of Nauset, three small wood lighthouses that had been decommissioned. Nauset Light was originally all white, but in the 1940s, the top section of the tower was painted red, creating the iconic appearance.

The light was automated and the keeper's house was sold in 1955. The original fourth-order Fresnel lens was removed in 1981 and replaced with aerobeacons. The lens is on display in the Salt Pond Visitor Center of the Cape Cod National Seashore.  In December 2008, the old-style bulbs in the aerobeacons were replaced with 400 watt metal halide bulbs.

In 1993, the Coast Guard proposed decommissioning the light. Following a great public outcry, the non-profit Nauset Light Preservation Society was formed and funded, and in 1995, it leased the lighthouse from the Coast Guard. The move was accomplished successfully by International Chimney Corporation, which had moved the larger Highland Light a similar distance earlier that year, with assistance from Expert Movers and a consultant, Pete Friesen.

The light was again lit on May 10, 1997. During the ceremony at that time, the Coast Guard transferred ownership of the lighthouse to the National Park Service, but the operation was assumed by the Nauset Light Preservation Society.

In 1998, Mary Daubenspeck, who had owned the keeper's house since 1955, agreed to donate it to the National Park Service with the right to live in it for 25 years.  It was agreed that the house would be moved from its original location, then only  from the edge of the cliff, to a new location near the relocated tower. The move was completed in October 1998 by Gary Sylvester's Building Movers & Excavators.

Lighthouse keepers
The following individuals were keepers of this light after the tower was moved to Eastham from the Chatham Light in 1923.

George I. Herbolt (1923–1932)
John Poyner (1932)
Allison G. Haskins (1932–1938)
Fred S. Vidler (1938–1942)
Eugene L. Coleman (1942–1950 or 1952, depending on the source)

Current status
Since May 24, 2004, when the Nauset Light Preservation Society signed a partnership agreement with the National Park Service (Cape Cod National Seashore), the Service has operated the light as a private aid to navigation while the Society has covered all expenses related to the site by selling memberships and through donations. Visitors can tour the light and the oil house on Sundays from May to late October and also on Wednesdays during July and August.

The lighthouse is the logo for Cape Cod Potato Chips. It appears on a "Cape Cod & Islands" special licence plate which was introduced in 1996 and generates revenue for local counties and development organizations. It was added to the National Register of Historic Places in 1987 as Nauset Beach Light.

See also

National Register of Historic Places listings in Barnstable County, Massachusetts

References

Gothic Revival architecture in Massachusetts
Lighthouses completed in 1877
Lighthouses on the National Register of Historic Places in Massachusetts
Lighthouses in Barnstable County, Massachusetts
Eastham, Massachusetts
National Register of Historic Places in Cape Cod National Seashore
1877 establishments in Massachusetts